Sindh Industrial Trading Estate (SITE) is located in Karachi, Sindh, Pakistan. Designated as an Industrial Area in 1963, S.I.T.E is the oldest and the largest designated Industrial Area of Pakistan, encompassing 9700 acres (19 km²) of land. It contains approximately 2,400 factories.

History 
The estate benefits from the proximity of the Port of Karachi and various roads linking to the rest of Pakistan. The town grew up as worker colonies were established around the industrial estate.

The father of nation Quaid-e-Azam Muhammad Ali Jinnah came here in this area in July 1948 and attended the opening ceremony of Valika Textile Mills, the first textile mill of Pakistan. Moreover, the Valika family also established many hospitals and schools, the most notable being Valika Hospital. Soon after, under the leadership of Fakhruddin Valika, the Valikas grew and established their empire of industries which continued to flourish during the Ayubian Era.

Important information

Educational institutions 

 ITEC Public School, Metroville
 Apex Grammar School, Elahi Colony, S.I.T.E Town
 Baldia Government Secondary School (KMC) (Pathan Colony)
 Pak Falcon Academy School (Old Golimar)
 Rose Garden Secondary School (Islamia Colony)
 Rose Garden Elementary School (Islamia Colony)
 Generations School
 Generations University
 Naz Public Secondary School (Islamia Colony No:1)
 Al-Habib Public School (Qasba Colony)
 Mohammad Hamid Badayoni College
 Metrovil Girls College
 Teacher Training College
 Karachi Polytechnique College
 Lee Rosary Secondary Public School
 Hashmi Public Secondary School (Pathan Colony)
 Fida Muhammad College
 Javed College
 Sindh Government College for Technology (GCT)
 Mumtaz Montessori
 The Educators
 Noor-ul-Huda Secondary Public School
 Standard High School
 New Vision Grammar Secondary School (Frontier Colony No1 Keekar Ground)
 The Perfect Paradise Secondary School (Bukhari Colony, Banaras Colony)
 The Rising Star Grammar Secondary School (Metroville)
 Young Scholar Grammar Secondary School (Maxico Ground )
 Pearl Public Grammar Secondary School (Sabri Baba Frontier Colony Karachi)
 Global Choice Grammar Secondary School (Elahi Colony near Metro Cinema)
 Al Nasir Public School (Pathan Colony)
 Knowledge Foundation (Bawani Chali)
 Students Foundation (Bawani Chali)
 Habib Public School (Pathan Colony)
 Hamqadam Model School
 Iqra islamia Cadet School
 The Language Masters (Metroville Block-01)
 Islamia Public Secondary School (Block 5 Metroville)
 Wisdom House Public Secondary School (Block 2 Metroville)
 Al-fatah primary & secondary school ( Metroville ).

Hospitals 

 Faiz Rehman Hospital
 Valika Hospital
 7 Dispensaries
 1 Maternity Home
 Metro Lions Hospital
 Aga Khan Community Clinic
 Khyber neuro brain and spine Clinic Dr. Shamsher Ali Khan
 Salam Clinic

Parks 

 Trans Lyari Park (Guttar Bhagicha)
 Model Park Metrovil sahil
 National Modren Park

Graveyards 

 Mewahshah Graveyard
 Shahenshah Ghat
 Metrovill Graveyard
 Tower of Silence
 Muhammad Pur Graveyard, Qasba Colony

The Mewa Shah Graveyard is the oldest graveyard of the city existing since the 16th century.  Inside the Graveyard, famous Khanqah of prominent saint of Pakistan Baba Zaheen Shah Taji is also there.

Mosques and madaris 

 Jamia Binoria
 Khulfa-e-Rashideen (Old Golimar)
 Jamia Ashrafia (Imdadia)
 250 Mosques
 8 Imambargahs
 21 Churches
 1 Mandir
 Masjid Quba, Block 5, Metroville 1
 Jamaa` Masjid Bilal Islamia Colony #2
 Madrasa Siddiqia Taleem Ul Quran lil-banat (Girls) Islamia Colony # 2
 Rehmani Masjid (Pathan Colony)
 Makkah Masjid (Pathan Colony)

Markets 

 Shershah Kabari Bazar
 Bismillah Hotel Market (Old Golimar)
 Lunda Bazar (Banaras Chowk)
 Makro Market (Valika Chowrangi)
 Aligarh Bazar

Police stations 

 Pak Colony Police Station (Old Golimar)
 S.I.T.E.(A) Police Station
 S.I.T.E.(B) Police Station
 Pirabad Police Station

See also
 SITE Town
 SITE: Sindh Industrial & Trading Estate
 Bin Qasim Industrial Zone
 Federal B Industrial Area
 Karachi Export Processing Zone
 Korangi Creek Industrial Park
 Korangi Industrial Area
 North Karachi Industrial Area
 Pakistan Textile City
 West Wharf Industrial Area

References

External links
 SITE Association of Industry - Official site

Industrial parks in Karachi
1963 establishments in Pakistan
SITE Town